Augustus the Strong is a 1936 German-Polish biographical film directed by Paul Wegener and starring Michael Bohnen, Lil Dagover, and Marieluise Claudius. The film depicts the life of Augustus the Strong, the Eighteenth Century ruler of Saxony and Poland. It was partly shot at the Grunewald Studios in Berlin. The film's sets were designed by the art directors Karl Machus and Ludwig Reiber.

Production
A multiple-language version was made in Polish, directed by Stanisław Wasylewski and featuring a Polish cast. Another Polish-German co-production Adventure in Warsaw was produced the following year.

Cast

See also
The King's Prisoner (1935)

References

Bibliography

 Bock, Hans-Michael . Die Tobis 1928-1945: eine kommentierte Filmografie. Edition Text + Kritik, 2003.
 Klaus, Ulrich J. Deutsche Tonfilme: Jahrgang 1936. Klaus-Archiv, 1988.

External links

1930s biographical films
1930s historical films
German biographical films
German historical films
Polish biographical films
Polish historical films
1930s German-language films
Films directed by Paul Wegener
Films set in the 18th century
Films of Nazi Germany
Biographical films about German royalty
German black-and-white films
Polish black-and-white films
Films set in the Kingdom of Saxony
1930s German films